Andrew Man (sometimes spelt Andro Man) was a cunning man and healer in Aberdeen who was tried as a witch in 1597 and burnt in 1598.  He said that his powers came from the Queen of Elphame – a fairy queen with whom he had regularly consorted.

References

1598 deaths
16th-century Scottish medical doctors
People executed by Scotland by burning
People executed for witchcraft
People from Aberdeen
Witch trials in Scotland